Antoine Aimable Elie Elwart (19 September 1808 – 14 October 1877) was a French composer and musicologist.

Biography

Childhood
Elwart was born in Paris in the family home. At the age of ten, he became a chorister at the mastery of the Saint-Eustache church: Antoine Ponchard (a master of the chapel since 1815) ensured his first musical training. This teaching marked him for all his life, and spiritual music remained one of his great influences.

Curious to discover the activity of professional musicians, he escaped from the work of manufacturer of crates where his parents had sent him and managed to become second violin in a street orchestra. In 1823, at the age of fifteen, a mass with four voices and a large orchestra of his composition was given at St-Roch Church.

Training
In 1825, the singer Cambon interpreted a scene by Elwart on the motif of the "Exiled". This year marked especially his entrance to the École royale de musique (the future Conservatoire de Paris) in counterpoint, harmony and fugue and music composition classes. His professors were François-Joseph Fétis, Jean-François Lesueur, Berlioz. Elwart was awarded the First Fugue Prize in 1830. In 1835, he performed a new Mass for Saint Cecilia.

He attempted the Grand prix de Rome in 1831 with the cantata La Fuite de Bianca Capello but only won second prize.

Prix de Rome
He had to wait until 1834 to win the Grand Prix with L'Entrée en loge, a cantata composed on a text by Jean François Gail. He thus became a boarder at the Villa Medici. He left his post as a tutor for the composing class of Antoine Reicha during his stay at Villa Medici.

Already known to the Parisian public, he played in France his compositions that he sent from Rome. He produced a Deuxième messe solennelle in 1835 dedicated to the Duchess of Orleans, an Italian opera and the funeral Omaggio alla memoria di Vincenzo Bellini (November 1835, Teatro Valle, Rome) in hommage to the famous opera composer who died shortly before. He presented an Ouverture on 20 October 1838, badly received by a skeptical jury and against possible innovations: the three voices of men on the second motif in E minor probably left a bitter taste.

Career at the Conservatoire
Back in Paris in 1837, he returned to the Conservatoire, but became assistant professor of Reicha, then holder of his own class created by Cherubini, the director of the Conservatoire de Paris. Elwart held the post until his retirement in 1871. Among his pupils were Louis-Aimé Maillart, Théodore Gouvy, Jean-Baptiste Weckerlin, Émile Prudent, Olivier Métra, Edmond Hocmelle, Adolphe Blanc, Albert Gisarn, Victor Frédéric Verrimst and Oscar Comettant who described him as "an ingenious and witty scholar". It seems that he had a good relationship with his pupils, the latter ironically calling him "little father Elwart".

In parallel with his classes, Antoine Elwart was a prolific composer: he wrote a Messe solennelle in 1838 for the baptism of the Comte de Paris (future pretender "Philippe VII"), and presented on 24 August. On 4 February, he had a mass played at the église St. Eustache, with Pierre-Louis Dietsch as the organist and Ambroise Thomas as the conductor.

Elwart died in the 18th arrondissement of Paris.

Decorations
He received the Royal and Distinguished Spanish Order of Charles III by King Charles III of Spain. King Frederick II of Prussia (Frederick the Great) decorated him with the Order of the Red Eagle. He was awarded the French order of the Légion d'honneur in 1873 in the salle du Conservatoire in the Conservatoire de Paris, a distinction to which he responded in the tone of humour: Vive la République!

Works
1823: Messe, for four voices and grand orchestra
1831: La Fuite de Bianca Capello, cantata
1832: Cäcilienmesse
1834: L'Entrée en loge, cantata
1835: Deuxième Messe solennelle
1835: Omaggio alla memoria di Vicenzo Bellini
1838: Messe solennelle
 Miserere for eight solo singers
1840: Les Catalans, opera (Rouen)
1845: Noé ou le Déluge universel, Symphonie-oratorio
1846: La Naissance d'Eve, oratorio 
1847: Chœur de Alceste by Euripides
1848: Te Deum républicain
1850: Ruth et Booz, Symphony
1855: Messe for three singers and large orchestra
1856: Le Sommeil de Pénélope, lyrical monologue
1867: Premier quatuor for piano, violin, viola and cello
1868: Le Parnasse de Raphaël, grande allégorie scénique pour violon
 Hymne à Sainte Cécile
 La Visière, opéra comique
 Comme l'amour s’en va, opéra comique
 Le Salut impérial, cantata

Writings
1830: Théorie musicale
1838: Duprez, sa vie artistique, avec une biographie authentique de son maître, Alexandre Choron (Paris, Magen)
1838: Heures de l’enfance, poésie de Mme Virginie Orsini, recueil de prières, cantiques et récréations, à l’usage des maisons d’éducation des deux sexes, collèges, pensionnats, écoles primaires et salles d’asile, mis en musique et précédé d’un Essai sur l’art de chanteur en chœur by A. Elwart
1838: Discours sur cette question : Quelles sont les causes qui ont donné naissance à la musique religieuse? Pourquoi s’est-elle écartée de son but? Et quels seraient les moyens de l’y ramener?
1838: Études élémentaires de la musique depuis ses premières notions jusqu'à celles de la composition, divisées en trois parties: connaissances préliminaires, méthode de chant, méthode d’harmonie
1839: Petit manuel d'harmonie, d'accompagnement de la basse chiffrée, de réduction de la partition au piano et de transposition musicale, contenant en outre des règles pour parvenir à écrire la basse ou un accompagnement de piano sous toute espèce de mélodie
1841: Feuille harmonique, contenant la théorie et la pratique de tous les accords du système moderne
1844: L'Art de jouer impromptu de l'alto
1844: Le Chanteur-accompagnateur, ou traité du clavier, de la basse chiffrée, de l'harmonie, simple et composée…
1844: Le Chanteur accompagnateur ou Traité du clavier, de la basse chiffrée, de l'harmonie simple et composée, suivi de la manière de faire les notes d'agrément…
1846: Projet relatif à l'organisation d'une chapelle-musique municipale de la ville de Paris
1860: Histoire de la Société des concerts du Conservatoire impérial de musique, avec dessins, musique, plans, portraits, notices biographiques
1862: Manuel des aspirants aux grades de sous-chefs et de chefs de musique dans l'armée
1864: Histoire des concerts populaires de musique classique, contenant les programmes annotés de tous les concerts donnés au Cirque Napoléon depuis leur fondation jusqu'à ce jour, suivie de six esquisses sur la vie et les œuvres de J.Haydn, Mozart, Beethoven, Weber, Mendelsohn et R. Schumann
1864: Histoire de la Société des Concerts populaires de musique classique
1865: Lutrin et orphéon, grammaire musicale dans laquelle le plain-chant et la musique sont appris en chantant des chœurs, enrichie d’airs français arrangés à 2, 3 et 4 voix égales
1867: Essai sur la composition chorale
1869: Petit traité d’instrumentation à l’usage des jeunes compositeurs
 Essai sur la composition musicale suivi de Petit manuel d'harmonie, d'accompagnement, de la basse chiffrée, de réduction de la partition au piano et de transposition musicale
 Théorie musicale, solfège progressif
 L'Art de chanter en chœur

Quotes
 Elwart expresses "sympathy for the things which contribute to give a modest splendor to the so poetic cult of religion."
 "The merit of these sacred works must be observed with all the more care because it testifies to the elevated feeling of their author as much as to his disinterested love for art." Berlioz, Journal des débats 6 April 1838
 Qu'est-ce qu'un musicien? Elwart's answer published in the Univers musical 9 July 1863:

References

External links
 Antoine Elwart on Musopen
 Antoine Elwart on IMSLP
 Antoine Elwart on Amis et Passionnés du Père Lachaise
 Antoine Elwart on Musica et memoria

1808 births
1877 deaths
19th-century classical composers
19th-century French musicologists
19th-century male musicians
Academic staff of the Conservatoire de Paris
Burials at Père Lachaise Cemetery
Chevaliers of the Légion d'honneur
Conservatoire de Paris alumni
French composers of sacred music
French opera composers
French Romantic composers
Male opera composers
Musicians from Paris
Pupils of Anton Reicha
Prix de Rome for composition
Sacred music composers
Writers about music
19th-century musicologists